Leptospermum madidum is a species of shrub or small tree that is endemic to north-western Australia. It has weeping branches, smooth bark, pale green linear leaves, small white flowers and thin-walled fruit.

Description
The flower buds are arranged singly in leaf axils surrounded by bracts that are shed before the flower opens.

Taxonomy and naming
This species was first formally described in 1920 by Cyril Tenison White and William D. Francis who gave it the name Agonis longifolia and published the description in the Botany Bulletin, Department of Agriculture, Queensland. In 1958 Stanley Thatcher Blake changed the name to Leptospermum longifolium but the name was an illegitimate name because it had already been used for a different species. 1992 by Anthony Bean changed the name to Leptospermum madidum, publishing the change in the journal Austrobaileya. The specific epithet (madidum) is from a Latin word meaning "moist" or "wet", referring to the species' growing on the banks of freshwater creeks and rivers.

In the same journal, Bean described two subspecies and their names are accepted by the Australian Plant Census:

Distribution and habitat
Subspecies madidum is confined to the Cape York Peninsula where it grows on the banks of creeks and rivers. Subspecies sativum is found along watercourses and in sandstone gullies in the Kimberley region of Western Australia and the northernmost parts of the Northern Territory.

Conservation status
Leptospermum madidum is listed as "not threatened" by the Government of Western Australia Department of Biodiversity, Conservation and Attractions, but subsp. sativum is classified as "Priority Three" meaning that it is poorly known and known from only a few locations but is not under imminent threat.

References

madidum
Flora of Queensland
Flora of Western Australia
Flora of the Northern Territory
Plants described in 1992